Peter Logan may refer to:

 Peter Logan (footballer) (1890–1944), Scottish footballer from Edinburgh, played for Bradford City
Paddy Logan (footballer) (Peter Logan, fl. 1898–99), Scottish footballer from Glasgow, played for Woolwich Arsenal
 Peter Logan, Manitoba Liberal Party candidate in the 1999 Manitoba provincial election